The 2019 Dubai Tennis Championships (also known as the Dubai Duty Free Tennis Championships for sponsorship reasons) was an ATP Tour 500 event on the 2019 ATP Tour and a WTA Premier 5 event on the 2019 WTA Tour. Both events were held at the Aviation Club Tennis Centre in Dubai, United Arab Emirates. The women's tournament took place from 17 to 23 February and the men's tournament from 25 February–2 March.

Points and prize money

Point distribution

Prize money

*per team

ATP singles main-draw entrants

Seeds 

 Rankings are as of February 18, 2019.

Other entrants 
The following players received wildcards into the singles main draw:
  Marcos Baghdatis
  Ramkumar Ramanathan
  Mohamed Safwat

The following players received entry from the qualifying 
  Ričardas Berankis
  Thomas Fabbiano
  Egor Gerasimov
  Corentin Moutet

The following players received entry as lucky losers:
  Ilya Ivashka
  Jiří Veselý

Withdrawals
  Aljaž Bedene → replaced by  Ilya Ivashka
  Chung Hyeon → replaced by  Benoît Paire
  Pierre-Hugues Herbert → replaced by  Denis Kudla
  Mikhail Kukushkin → replaced by  Jiří Veselý
  Andy Murray → replaced by  Robin Haase

ATP doubles main-draw entrants

Seeds 

 Rankings are as of February 18, 2019.

Other entrants
The following pairs received wildcards into the doubles main draw:
  Leander Paes /  Benoît Paire
  Jürgen Melzer /  Nenad Zimonjić

The following pair received entry from the qualifying draw:
  Jeevan Nedunchezhiyan /  Purav Raja

WTA singles main-draw entrants

Seeds 

 Rankings are as of February 11, 2019.

Other entrants
The following players received wildcards into the singles main draw:
  Fatma Al-Nabhani
  Eugenie Bouchard
  Sara Errani
 Samantha Stosur

The following players received entry from the qualifying draw:
  Lara Arruabarrena
  Jennifer Brady
  Zarina Diyas
  Magdalena Fręch
  Lucie Hradecká
  Ivana Jorović
  Bernarda Pera
  Zhu Lin

The following players received entry as lucky losers:
  Polona Hercog
  Dalila Jakupović
  Stefanie Vögele

Withdrawals

Before the tournament
 Ashleigh Barty → replaced by  Ons Jabeur
 Danielle Collins → replaced by  Ekaterina Makarova
 Camila Giorgi → replaced by  Dalila Jakupović
 Madison Keys → replaced by  Dayana Yastremska
 Maria Sakkari → replaced by  Tímea Babos
 Samantha Stosur → replaced by  Stefanie Vögele
 Wang Qiang → replaced by  Vera Lapko
 Caroline Wozniacki → replaced by  Polona Hercog

Retirements
 Ons Jabeur (right shoulder injury)
 Yulia Putintseva (low back injury)

WTA doubles main-draw entrants

Seeds 

 Rankings are as of February 11, 2019.

Other entrants
The following pairs received a wildcard into the doubles main draw:
  Julia Elbaba  /  Alena Fomina 
  Sarah Beth Grey  /  Eden Silva

The following pairs received entry as alternates:
  Eugenie Bouchard  /  Sofia Kenin
  Prarthana Thombare /  Eva Wacanno

Withdrawals 
Before the tournament
  Elise Mertens (left hip injury)
  Anastasija Sevastova (low back injury)
  Samantha Stosur (personal reasons)

During the tournament
  Eugenie Bouchard (left abdominal injury)
  Ons Jabeur (right shoulder injury)

Champions

Men's singles

  Roger Federer def.  Stefanos Tsitsipas, 6–4, 6–4

Women's singles

  Belinda Bencic def.  Petra Kvitová, 6–3, 1–6, 6–2

Men's doubles

  Rajeev Ram /  Joe Salisbury def.  Ben McLachlan /  Jan-Lennard Struff, 7–6(7–4), 6–4

Women's doubles

  Hsieh Su-wei /  Barbora Strýcová def.  Lucie Hradecká /  Ekaterina Makarova, 6–4, 6–4

References

External links
 Official website

 
2019
2019 ATP Tour
2019 WTA Tour
February 2019 sports events in Asia
March 2019 sports events in Asia